Cervantite is an antimony oxide mineral with formula Sb3+Sb5+O4 (antimony tetroxide).

It was first described in 1850 for an occurrence in Cervantes, Sierra de Ancares, Lugo, Galicia, Spain, and named for the locality. The mineral was questioned and disapproved, but re-approved and verified in 1962 based on material from the Zajaca-Stolice district, Brasina, Serbia. It occurs as a secondary alteration product of antimony bearing minerals, mainly stibnite.

References

Oxide minerals
Antimony minerals
Orthorhombic minerals
Minerals in space group 33